Markus Egen (14 September 1927 – 28 May 2021) was a German ice hockey player who competed in the 1952 Winter Olympics, in the 1956 Winter Olympics, and in the 1960 Winter Olympics. He was born in Füssen.

References

External links
 

1927 births
2021 deaths
Germany men's national ice hockey team coaches
Olympic ice hockey players of Germany
Olympic ice hockey players of the United Team of Germany
Ice hockey players at the 1952 Winter Olympics
Ice hockey players at the 1956 Winter Olympics
Ice hockey players at the 1960 Winter Olympics
Sportspeople from Füssen